A TCR Touring Car is a touring car specification, first introduced in 2014 and is now employed by a multitude of series worldwide. All TCR Touring Cars are front-wheel drive cars based on 4 or 5 door production vehicles, and are powered by 1.75 to 2.0 litre turbocharged engines. While the bodyshell and suspension layout of the production vehicle is retained in a TCR car, and many models use a production gearbox, certain accommodations are made for the stresses of the racetrack including upgraded brakes and aerodynamics. Competition vehicles are subject to Balance of Performance (or BoP) adjustments to ensure close racing between different vehicles.

History 
The project to develop the TCR specification was spearheaded by former World Touring Car Championship manager Marcello Lotti. All TCR cars have a common forefather; the SEAT León Cup Racer racing car which was introduced as successor to the SEAT León Supercopa used in several successful single-make series. The 2.0L engine formula was derived from this car, as well as the standardised front splitter and rear wing. Initially, the specification and accompanying international series was known as TC3, to indicate its intended position at the entry-level end of the touring car pyramid. However, upon being approved by the FIA in December 2014, the specification was renamed TCR.

Technical regulations 

On 15 September 2014, technical regulations for the category were announced. On 22 January 2016, minor changes were applied.

Eligible cars: 4/5-door vehicles

Body shell: Reinforced production body shell; wheel arch modifications allowed to accommodate tyres

Minimum weight: 1250 kg for cars with production gearbox, 1285 kg for cars with racing gearbox (both including the driver)

Minimum overall length: 4.20 metres

Maximum overall width: 1.95 metres

Engine: Turbo-charged petrol or diesel up to 2.0-litre

Torque: 

Power: 

Lubrication: Wet sump

Exhaust: Homologated catalytic converter using production parts

Traction: On two wheels

Gearbox: Production or TCR International Series sequential; production paddle shift accepted

Front Suspension: Production lay-out; parts free design

Rear Suspension: Original design of production car with reinforced components

Brakes:
 Front: max 6 piston calipers, brake discs max diameter 380mm
 Rear: max 2 piston callipers; production ABS accepted
Wheels: Maximum dimensions of rim: 10″ x 18″

Aerodynamics:
 Front splitter: 2014 SEAT León Eurocup
 Rear wing: FIA Appendix J Art. 263 2014
 Ground clearance: Minimum 80 mm
 Power/Weight Ratio: Subject to the Balance of Performance (changing between +70 and -20 kg from the minimum car weight)
 Drivetrain : FF layout

WTCR regulations 
The FIA licensed the TCR regulations under the name of WTCR for usage in the World Touring Car Cup. The specification is identical, however it is frozen until the end of 2019, and cars are required to obtain an FIA passport after going through TCR homolgation.

TCR Model of the Year 
Since 2017, TCR organisers World Sporting Consulting (WSC) have awarded the TCR Model of the Year award for the most successful TCR car across a year. The title is awarded on the basis of a points system that gives points to all the different TCR-certified cars competing in all the TCR-sanctioned races of the year. The points are adjusted by coefficients that take into account the level of the competition, the number of cars participating and the number of manufacturers represented.

Winners

Eligible cars

List of TCR Series

International Series using TCR regulations as their main or subsidiary class

FIA World Touring Car Cup 

On 6 December 2017, FIA's World Motorsport Council announced the creation of the long waited FIA World Touring Car Cup. The new series has been officially confirmed after a deal was reached to bring the World Touring Car Championship, the TCR International Series and the European Touring Car Cup together.

TCR Asia Series 
TCR Asia Series was announced on 14 August 2014 by the organisation behind the TCR series under the name TC3 Asia Series - later changed to TCR Asia Series along with the other announced series. David Sonenscher, boss of the company Motorsport Asia, will be maintaining the series. He has previously run the Asian Touring Car Series and the Porsche Carrera Cup Asia. Initially seven races were planned for 2015, but later were reduced to 5 and the final calendar was with 4. The Singapore and Thailand rounds were run together with the TCR International Series, while the rest supported the GT Asia Series calendar.

TCR Trophy Europe/TCR Europe Series 

On 15 October 2015, Marcello Lotti revealed plans for a European Series including one round from each TCR European championship (Italy, Spain, Germany, Portugal, Russia and Benelux), starting from 2016. On 26 February 2016, the European Trophy was launched, with six rounds (Spanish championship was excluded for not having an own series and Benelux series had two rounds). Subsequent change was made during the course of the season to include additional round from German series.

For the 2017 edition was adopted the one-off event format with two races. For 2018 it was upgraded to TCR Europe Series with 7 events, five of which would support International GT Open.

24H Series and Touring Car Endurance Series 

TCR cars are allowed to compete in 24H Series alongside the GT cars. Initially the two series had their separate calendars and TCR entires were eligible to enter and score points in both championships until 2017. In 2018 the calendars for 24H Series, Touring Car Endurance Series (renamed 24H TCE Series) and 24H Proto Series were unified and touring cars were only eligible to enter and score points in the 24H TCE Series championship.

FIA Motorsport Games 
TCR touring cars are used as part of the Touring Car Cup of the FIA Motorsport Games.

National and regional Series using TCR regulations as their main or subsidiary class

TCR Italy Touring Car Championship 
On 31 January 2015, Automobile Club d'Italia announced the TCR category as the third division of the Campionato Italiano Turismo Endurance, also competing for the general classification of the championship. On 12 September 2015, the TCR Italian Series was relaunched as a stand-alone category for 2016.

TCR Benelux Touring Car Championship 
In December 2014 the Royal Automobile Club of Belgium (RACB) and Kronos Events announced the formation of the TCR Benelux Touring Car Championship. The inaugural season is set for 2016 with one-off event planned for 15 October 2015 at the Circuit Jules Tacheny Mettet. The schedule consists of seven rounds in the Benelux region, across Belgium, Netherlands and Luxembourg. Each round includes five races: a 60 minutes endurance race, with mandatory pit stop, and four 20 minutes sprint races. The starting grid for the endurance race is established by a popular vote via Facebook, through the Making the Grid application (later changed to aggregate score from the votes and the fast lap practice session with fan voting having bigger weight); sprint race 1 uses the best lap of after pit during long race to determine the starting grid, race 3 uses the best lap of before pit during long race; races 2 and 4 include a rolling start using the finishing order, respectively, of race 1 and 3.

For the 2017 season the fan voting was dropped and the starting grid for the endurance race was determined by a qualifying session instead. All races were held alongside Clio Cup Benelux, but with standalone classifications for both. At the end of the season Kronos Events withdrew their support for the series. Later it was announced that the series will support the TCR Europe Series bill at five of the seven rounds.

ADAC TCR Germany Touring Car Championship 

On 16 September 2015, the German Series was launched by ADAC and Engstler Motorsport, who already run in the International Series. The new category will run in the same events as ADAC GT Masters and ADAC Formula 4 as well as Deutscher Tourenwagen Cup (formerly ADAC Procar).

TCR Spanish Series 
On 15 February 2016, the Campeonato de España de Resistencia confirmed that they would introduce a TCR class in their championship. The championship calendar included five race weekends held across Spain.

TCR Middle East Series
On 15 November 2016, WSC announced that the creation of the TCR Middle East Series. The series will be officially launched on 2 December 2016 at the Bahrain International Circuit, where a media and test day will be held. The series will visit the Dubai Autodrome, Yas Marina Circuit and the Bahrain International Circuit.

TCR Scandinavia Touring Car Championship 

On 9 June 2016, the Scandinavian Touring Car Championship confirmed that they would switch to the TCR regulations for 2017 after racing with Silhouette cars since 2013. In 2017 the series will only race in Sweden, but a future expansion into the other Scandinavian countries is possible in the near future.

TCR Ibérico Touring Car Series 
On 8 November 2016, it was announced that the TCR Portuguese Series and TCR Spanish Series would merge, creating the TCR Ibérico Touring Car Series. The series will visit Portugal four times and Spain three times. Along with an overall title, two separate national titles were also awarded. On 20 January 2018 the TCR Ibérico Series was disbanded. It was later reinstated as two-event season with events from the Portuguese and European Series. On 20 December 2018 it was announced that the series would be re-launched as standalone series.

TCR Baltic Trophy 
On 23 July 2016, the organizers of the 1000 kilometrų lenktynės held on the Lithuanian Palanga circuit confirmed that they would add a TCR class to the event. With the ambition of establishing a proper championship beyond 2017, racing in the Baltic countries and Poland. The TCR Baltic Trophy was then introduced as part of the Baltic Touring Car Championship with TCR cars also participating in the supporting NEZ 6H Endurance Championship.

TCR China Touring Car Championship

On 12 January 2015, Marcello Lotti announced also a Chinese series planned for 2016. As for December 2015, a TCR class is confirmed as a category of the Chinese Touring Car Championship in 2016. The series was officially launched in December 2016, ahead of a five-round 2017 championship season, with the slight name change from Chinese to China.

TCR UK Touring Car Championship / Touring Car Trophy

On 6 April 2017, initial discussion about a TCR UK Series started between WSC and MSA. The series was given the go-ahead by the MSA on 7 July 2017, the series promoter will be BRSCC. The promoter is expecting about six or seven events for 2018, also confirming that there will be no grid limit. The 2018 seven round calendar was confirmed on 13 September 2017, with the series starting at the Silverstone Circuit, before going on the visit, Knockhill, Brands Hatch, Castle Combe, Oulton Park, Croft and Donington Park.

In 2019 TCR UK Touring Car Championship merged with the Stewart Lines organized Touring Car Trophy with TCR UK as its subcategory.

TCR Korea Touring Car Series 
On 30 November 2017, WSC Asia and J's Consulting announced the creation of the TCR Korea Series. The series will host a test day in June 2018 before beginning the season in July 2018, the series will conclude in October 2018.

TCR South America Series 
The TCR South America Series debuted in 2021, with races held in Argentina, Brazil and Uruguay.

TCR Swiss Trophy
In 2018, Auto Sport Switzerland will organize the TCR Swiss Trophy. The inaugural season consisted of five rounds, held together with TCR Europe (Zandvoort, Assen and Monza), TCR Italy (Imola), and ADAC TCR Germany (Red Bull Ring). On 20 December 2018 Auto Sport Switzerland entered into agreement with the ADAC TCR Germany promoters which will see all 7 rounds of the 2019 ADAC TCR Germany Touring Car Championship part of the 2019 TCR Swiss Trophy calendar. On 23 April 2019 it was announced by Auto Sport Switzerland that the TCR Swiss Trophy will be postponed until 2020 due to lack of entries.

24 Hours Nürburgring 
On 23 September 2015 ADAC Nordrhein and WSC Ltd. announced that the 2016 Nürburgring 24h Race will feature a class for TCR vehicles.

NLS 
Since 2017, the organizers of the NLS, formerly VLN, created a separate class for TCR cars. Previously TCR entrants entered the SP3 class.

Britcar Endurance 
Since 2017 Britcar Endurance, a UK based Endurance Championship running as the Dunlop Endurance Championship have accepted TCR Cars. The current specification Cars run in class 4 and are highly competitive with TCR Cars finishing on the class podium every time they have raced.

Super Taikyu Series 
TCR cars are eligible to compete in the Super Taikyu Series starting from the 2017 season.

Supercar Challenge 
TCR cars are eligible to compete in the Benelux-based Supercar Challenge, running in the Supersport 1 category with the cars being highly competitive.

Pirelli World Challenge / TC America Series
The Pirelli World Challenge allowed TCR-based cars in their TC class for the 2017 season, and will introduce a TCR-only class in 2018.  Unlike the IMSA Continental Tire SportsCar Challenge Series in the United States, which also is TCR-based for two or four hour races, the World Challenge races are shorter (no more than 50 minutes for a typical event) and are single-driver races.

With the separation of classes from the Pirelli World Challenge, WC Vision and the SRO Motorsport Group created the TC America Series, for cars that previously competed in the TC / TCA / TCR categories. For the initial season of 2019, there will be 8 events with 2 40-minute races. A DSG Cup was also announced for cars equipped with DSG transmission.

Michelin Pilot Challenge (formerly Continental Tire SportsCar Challenge)

In June 2017, Officials from IMSA and World Sporting Consulting (WSC) as the rights holder for TCR confirmed plans for the TCR class to begin competing in the IMSA Continental Tire SportsCar Challenge beginning in 2018.
The class will run in addition to the two existing Continental Tire SportsCar Challenge classes, Grand Sport (GS) and Street Tuner (ST) in the 2018 season.  Unlike most TCR-based series, the SportsCar Challenge series races are longer, as they are two-driver races lasting either two or four hours.  Like the Pirelli World Challenge, they will be under the auspices of the Automobile Competition Club of the United States, as IMSA and USAC are both members of the United States ASN.

NGK UAE Touring Car Championship
From the season 2018–19, the national championship happens to have a TCR class in races. The sporting format will provide two 20-minute Qualifying sessions and two 30-minute races at each of the seven events that form the calendar; the first of them will be held at Abu Dhabi's Yas Marina Circuit and the others in Dubai. The addition of the TCR class is one of the measures to popularize TCR in the Middle East.

TCR Malaysia Series

It was announced by Motorsport Asia Limited, which also organizes the TCR Asia Series, that on October 10, 2018, the creation of TCR Malaysia for the beginning of the year 2019. The championship served as preparation for other championships as the TCR Asia. There are scheduled 3 rounds with 6 races all held at the Sepang International Circuit, in supporting of GT Masters/Formula 3 Asia Winter Series and Asian Le Mans Series.

TCR Australia Series

A TCR series was established in Australia starting in 2019. The series is run as part of the Shannons Nationals Motor Racing Championships.

TCR Japan Series 

In an agreement between WSC Ltd and Japan TCR Management, will begin in 2019, the TCR Japan Series. The competition will take advantage of the success of the class in the Super Taikyu endurance series and will run on the same weekends as the Super Formula, the most important single-seater category in Japan. The agreement is valid for the next 6 years, until 2024. One of the goals is to attract other Japanese car manufacturers to the TCR category.

TCR Eastern Europe Trophy 

WSC Ltd and Race Event Management signed an agreement, to create the TCR Eastern Europe Trophy. The trophy will only be eligible for teams and drivers from eastern Europe. For 2019 they will share two events with TCR Europe Series as well as having four events as part of the ESET V4 Cup.

Canadian Touring Car Championship
The Canadian Touring Car Championship added TCR class alongside the existing GT Cup, GT Sport and Touring Car classes in 2019.

TCR Spa 500 
WSC Ltd and Creventic announced a 500 lap endurance race in early October set to be held at the Circuit de Spa-Francorchamps. The first event ran from 3–6 October 2019. The second event will take place on 1–3 May.

TCR Denmark Series 
The TCR Denmark Series debuted in 2020, planning to run six or seven events across Denmark.

TCR Chinese Taipei Touring Car Championship 
The TCR Taiwan Championship debuted in 2022.

Series scheduled to use TCR regulations as main or subsidiary class

TCR New Zealand Series 
After an agreement between Motorsport New Zealand and WSC Ltd, TCR New Zealand Series is scheduled to debut in 2020.

Defunct series that used or intended to use TCR as main or subsidiary class

TCR International Series 

The TCR International Series was the flagship TCR series from its inauguration in 2015 until 2017, after which it was retired to make way for the new World Touring Car Cup.

European Touring Car Cup 
In 2015 the FIA designated the TCN-2 nomenclature to the TCR regulations. This allowed the TCR-spec cars to compete in the Super 2000 class (later renamed ETCC-1) of the European Touring Car Cup alongside the older TC2 and TC2T cars previously used by the World Touring Car Championship.

From the 2017 season ETCC began using the TCR technical rules instead of the FIA's TCN-2 ones. After WTCC and TCR International Series merged to form the brand new FIA World Touring Car Cup in 2018, the European Touring Car Cup was also disbanded in the process.

TCR USA 
On 20 December 2014 it has been announced there will be a US-based series launched in 2015 as part of the California-based United States Touring Car Championship as a promotional category, with a view to moving to a full season in 2016. There were no entries during the 2015 season and the plans for TCR USA Series were never materialized. Instead, IMSA's Continental Tire SportsCar Challenge and USAC's Pirelli World Challenge adopted TCR regulations as part of their packages.

TC Open 
17 January 2017 confirmed that the TCR will be the main class in the new racing series TC Open from the organizers of GT Open and Euroformula Open. 1 June 2017 confirmed that GT Sport postpones the TC Open for a certain period due to low number of entries. However, the championship never materialized and instead for 2018 TCR Europe Series became part of GT Open's support bill for 5 rounds.

TCR Las Américas Series 
On 4 May 2016, Marcello Lotti launched the TCR Las Américas Series. The series would begin in Mexico in October supporting the 2016 Mexican Grand Prix and then go on to visit the United States in November, the Dominican Republic in December, Guatemala in January 2017, Costa Rica in February, with both Colombia and the season finale in Venezuela being visited in March. However, no races were held in neither 2016 or 2017.

On 28 November 2017 the series promoters announced a re-launch, with the series set for a 2018 début. With races scheduled to be held in the Dominican Republic and Mexico. The status of the series as of 2019 is unknown.

TCR Thailand Touring Car Championship 
On 5 July 2015 the Thailand series was presented to the local media. The promoter is Racing Spirit Co. Ltd., organiser of the Thailand Super Series, and the championship is planned to start in 2016.

TCR Portugal Touring Car Championship 
On 6 September 2014 FullEventos announced the TC3 Portuguese Series, later renamed TCR Portuguese Series along with the rest of the series announced at the time The series will be one of the six categories of the touring class in the Campeonato Nacional de Velocidade. From 2016 the series was relaunched as Campeonato Nacional de Velocidade Turismos with the TCR regulations as its main class.

Notes

References

External links
TCR Series Official website
TCR TV

Touring car racing
+TCR